Omaha Township is one of ten townships in Gallatin County, Illinois.  As of the 2010 census, its population was 499 and it contained 226 housing units.

Geography

Cities, towns, villages
 Omaha

Cemeteries
The township contains these six cemeteries: Adkin, Palestine Number 1, Palestine Number 2, Poplar, Shane and Shaw.

Major highways
  U.S. Route 45
  Illinois Route 1

Demographics

School districts
 Eldorado Community Unit School District 4
 Gallatin Community Unit School District 7
 Norris City-Omaha-Enfield Community Unit School District 3

Political districts
 Illinois's 15th congressional district
 State House District 118
 State Senate District 59

References
 
 United States Census Bureau 2007 TIGER/Line Shapefiles
 United States National Atlas

External links
 City-Data.com
 Illinois State Archives

Townships in Gallatin County, Illinois
Townships in Illinois